David Grant Williams (born 16 April 1961) is a Church of England bishop. He is the current Bishop of Basingstoke, a suffragan bishop in the Diocese of Winchester. Before his consecration in 2014, he was vicar of Christ Church, Winchester.

Early life
Williams was born on 16 April 1961 in Reading, England, and spend his childhood in Uganda. He studied social policy at the University of Bristol, graduating with a Bachelor of Science (BSc) degree.

After university, he spent a number of years working in Kenya with the Church Mission Society. Along with his missionary work, he was deputy head of a secondary school in eastern Kenya. He returned to the UK to study for ordination at Wycliffe Hall, Oxford.

Ordained ministry
Williams began his ordained ministry as a curate at All Saints Church, Ecclesall, in the Diocese of Sheffield from 1989 to 1992. He was then vicar of Christ Church, Dore, before being appointed Rural Dean of Ecclesall in 1997. In 2002, he became the vicar of Christ Church, Winchester. During his time at Christ Church, he also served the wider community: he set up the city's street pastors project, and made visits to Winchester Prison, to the Royal Hampshire County Hospital and to the University of Winchester. In 2012, he was appointed an honorary canon of Winchester Cathedral.

He was elected to the General Synod, the governing body of the Church of England, in 2010. As a priest, he joined the House of Clergy. In 2012, he was appointed Chair of the House of Clergy of the Winchester diocesan synod. He stood down from these appointments upon becoming a bishop.

Episcopal ministry
In June 2014, it was announced that he would be the next Bishop of Basingstoke, a suffragan bishop in the Diocese of Winchester. On 19 September 2014, he was consecrated a bishop at Winchester Cathedral by Justin Welby, Archbishop of Canterbury. He led his first service as bishop at St Michael's Church, Basingstoke on 28 September 2014.

On 20 May 2021, it was reported that Tim Dakin, Bishop of Winchester, had "stepped back" as diocesan bishop for six weeks, in light of the threat of a diocesan synod motion of no confidence in his leadership. Williams also "stepped back" and Debbie Sellin, Bishop of Southampton, served as acting diocesan bishop. Williams' leave was later extended to the end of August 2021.

Personal life
In 1986, Williams married Helen Pacey. They have one daughter and one son, Sarah and Mark.

References

1961 births
Living people
Bishops of Basingstoke
Alumni of the University of Bristol
Alumni of Wycliffe Hall, Oxford
21st-century Church of England bishops
Evangelical Anglican bishops